The Golden Spirit Award is given annually to the Nippon Professional Baseball (NPB) player who "best exemplifies the game of baseball, sportsmanship, community involvement and the individual's contribution to his team", as voted on by members of the media.

Award winners

See also 
 Roberto Clemente Award
Nippon Professional Baseball#Awards
Baseball awards#Japan
List of Nippon Professional Baseball ERA champions

External links 
Sports Hochi

Nippon Professional Baseball trophies and awards
Sportsmanship trophies and awards
Awards established in 1999
1999 establishments in Japan